Mauro Amenta (born 23 October 1953 in Orbetello) is an Italian former footballer who played as a midfielder. He played for six seasons (101 games, 12 goals) in Serie A for Perugia, Fiorentina and Roma.

Honours
Roma
 Coppa Italia winner: 1979–80, 1980–81.

References

1953 births
Living people
Italian footballers
Association football midfielders
Pisa S.C. players
A.C. Perugia Calcio players
ACF Fiorentina players
A.S. Roma players
Delfino Pescara 1936 players
Serie A players
Serie B players
A.S.D. Civitavecchia 1920 players
People from Orbetello
Sportspeople from the Province of Grosseto
Footballers from Tuscany